{{Infobox artist discography
| Artist       = One Piece
| Image        = One Piece Stampede Soundtrack.jpg
| Caption      = Cover of One Piece: Stampede'''s soundtrack album
| Studio       = 112 (Total)
| Compilation  = 8
| Singles      = 51
| Soundtrack   = 17
| Option name  = Main composers
| Option       = Kohei TanakaShirō Hamaguchi
| 1Option name = Labels
| 1Option      = AvexNippon ColumbiaNAMCO BANDAI GamesSony Music Japan InternationalBMG Ariola
}}
More than 100 musical CDs have been created for the media franchise built around Eiichirō Oda's manga One Piece. Various theme songs and character songs were released on a total of 51 singles, many of them were also released in collected form on the 8 compilation albums or the 17 soundtrack CDs, along with background music from the anime television series, the feature films, and video games.

Kohei Tanaka and Shirō Hamaguchi are the main composers for One Piece anime soundtracks including OVAs, TV specials, films except One Piece: Film Gold'' which was composed by Yuki Hayashi and there are numerous other artists who have worked with Kohei Tanaka and Shirō Hamaguchi to produce the soundtracks.

On August 11, 2019, it was announced that Sakuramen, a musical group will be collaborating with Kohei Tanaka to compose music for the anime's Wano arc.

The anime television series currently consists of 41 pieces of theme music, 23 opening themes and 18 ending themes. As of episode 279, ending themes were omitted and, starting from episode 326 onwards, opening themes were extended from 110 seconds long to 150 seconds long. In episodes 1-206 of Funimation's English-language release of the series, the opening and ending themes were dubbed into English by various voice actors, before reverting to the Japanese versions from episodes 207 onward and later some openings were not licensed by Funimation's release, leaving only the narration dubbed on select opening themes.


Albums and track lists

Charts

Compilation albums 
All album were released by Avex record label.

Theme songs

Reception
Carl Kimlinger of Anime News Network states that "One Piece has always stood out for its use of music", which they describe as a "usual mix of trumpeting pirate bombast, rocking action music, and catchy individual themes". Margaret Veira of Active Anime states that the anime television series' "background music sets the mood and the scenes perfectly."

See also
 List of One Piece media

Notes

References

Anime soundtracks
Book soundtracks
Discographies of Japanese artists
Music